The 2019 Colonial Athletic Association men's basketball tournament was the postseason men's basketball tournament for the Colonial Athletic Association for  the 2018–19 NCAA Division I men's basketball season. The tournament was held March 9–12, 2019 at the North Charleston Coliseum in North Charleston, South Carolina. Northeastern defeated Hofstra 82–74 in the championship game and received the CAA's automatic bid to the NCAA tournament. It was the second title for Northeastern in the CAA, the last coming in 2015.

Seeds
All 10 CAA teams participated in the tournament. Teams were seeded by conference record, with a tiebreaker system used to seed teams with identical conference records. The top six teams received a bye to the quarterfinals.

Schedule

Bracket

* denotes overtime game

Game summaries

First round

Quarterfinals

Semifinals

Championship

Team and tournament leaders

Team leaders

See also
 2019 CAA women's basketball tournament

References

Colonial Athletic Association men's basketball tournament
Tournament
CAA men's basketball tournament
CAA men's basketball tournament
North Charleston, South Carolina
College basketball tournaments in South Carolina